Trishton Jackson (born March 9, 1998) is an American football wide receiver for the Minnesota Vikings of the National Football League (NFL). He played college football at Michigan State and Syracuse.

College career
Jackson began his collegiate career at Michigan State. As a true freshman, he caught five passes for 89 yards and one touchdown. He played in 12 games in his sophomore season, starting four and finishing the season with 12 receptions for 143 yards. After the season Jackson announced he would be transferring to Syracuse University.

Jackson sat out the 2018 regular season at Syracuse per NCAA transfer rules. He was eligible to play in the 2018 Camping World Bowl and caught three passes for 24 yards, including a 14-yard touchdown reception, in the Orange's 34-18 win over West Virginia. 

As a redshirt junior, he caught 66 passes for 1,023 yards and 11 touchdowns and was named second-team All-ACC. After the end of the season Jackson announced that he would forgo his final year of eligibility to enter the 2020 NFL Draft.

Professional career

Los Angeles Rams
Jackson was signed by the Los Angeles Rams as an undrafted free agent on April 25, 2020.

On August 31, 2021, Jackson was waived by the Rams.

Minnesota Vikings
On September 2, 2021, Jackson was signed to the Minnesota Vikings practice squad. He signed a reserve/future contract with the Vikings on January 10, 2022. He was waived on August 30, 2022 and re-signed to the practice squad the next day. He signed a reserve/future contract on January 16, 2023.

References

External links
Michigan State Spartans bio
Syracuse Orange bio
Los Angeles Rams bio

1998 births
Living people
People from West Bloomfield, Michigan
Players of American football from Michigan
American football wide receivers
Michigan State Spartans football players
Syracuse Orange football players
Los Angeles Rams players
Minnesota Vikings players